Deoxycytidine triphosphate (dCTP) is a nucleoside triphosphate that contains the pyrimidine base cytosine.  The triphosphate group contains high-energy phosphoanhydride bonds, which liberate energy when hydrolized.

DNA polymerase enzymes use this energy to incorporate deoxycytidine into a newly synthesized strand of DNA.  A chemical equation can be written that represents the process:

 (DNA)n + dCTP ↔ (DNA)n-C + PPi

That is, dCTP has the PPi (pyrophosphate) cleaved off and the dCMP is incorporated into the DNA strand at the 3' end.
Subsequent hydrolysis of the PPi drives the equilibrium of the reaction toward the right side, i.e. incorporation of the nucleotide in the growing DNA chain.

Like other nucleoside triphosphates, manufacturers recommend that dCTP be stored in aqueous solution at −20 °C.

See also
 DNA replication

References

External links
 Definitive Guide to dNTPs

Molecular biology
Nucleotides
Phosphate esters
Pyrimidones